International Brotherhood of Magicians (I.B.M.) is an organization for both professional and amateur close-up and stage magicians, with approximately 15,000 members worldwide. The headquarters is in St. Charles, Missouri. There are over 300 local groups, called Rings, in more than 88 countries, largely concentrated in cities of the United States and Canada. The organization publishes a monthly periodical entitled The Linking Ring, which features tricks, coverage of shows and events in the magic community, and interviews with magicians.

History

The organization was founded February 10, 1922 in Winnipeg, Manitoba by Len Vintus (stage name of Melvin Justus Given McMullen) of Transcona, Manitoba, which would later amalgamate with Winnipeg. Gene Gordon ( Gordon Avery) of Buffalo, New York, and Don Rogers (a.k.a. Ernest Schieldge). Unlike earlier magic clubs, such as the Society of American Magicians (S.A.M.) in the United States and The Magic Circle in England, the I.B.M. was begun by magicians living outside the major cities, who were unable to attend magic club meetings, and who kept in contact by post.

Gene Gordon established the first local group, Ring 1, in Rochester, New York. The original Ring 1 eventually disbanded, and St. Louis, Missouri later assumed the vacated title of Ring 1, which it continues to hold today. Since then, a new club, Ring 4, formed in Rochester.

The I.B.M. holds an annual convention, usually in June or July. Although the S.A.M. and the Magic Circle held banquets as early as 1905, the I.B.M. was the first to hold a magic convention, in Kenton, Ohio, on June 9–10, 1926. The 66th annual convention was held in Orlando, Florida.

Organization

Each international territory has a Territorial Vice President who coordinates with the Rings in that country and other Territorial Vice Presidents.

The International Brotherhood of Magicians has a number of local clubs, located throughout the world, known as Rings.  Each Ring was originally numbered in sequence, based on when it received its charter from the I.B.M. Since then, some clubs have dissolved, and newer clubs have assumed some of the vacated ring numbers.

Membership

Membership is open to amateur and professional magicians, as well as those who collect magic apparatus and effects. Active members must be at least 18 years old, and youth members must be 7–17 years of age. Active members must have had an interest in magic for at least two years, or one year for youth members.

Leadership
Since 1937, a new International President is elected to the I.B.M. each year.
Past presidents include:

{{columns-list|colwidth=35em|
Len Vintus	1922–1926
W.W. Durbin	1926–1937
John H. Davidson	1937–1938
T. J. Crawford	1938–1939
John Snyder Jr.	1939–1941
Robert C. Anderson	1941–1942
Eugene Bernstein	1942–1946
John Braun	1946–1947
A. Renerick Clark	1947–1948
H. Adrian Smith	1948–1949
William R Walsh	1949–1950
Walter Coleman	1950–1951
James B. Lake	1951–1952
Arthur D. Reichenback	1952–1953
Forrest P. Hendricks	1953–1954
C. James McLemore	1954–1955
Charles A. RossKam	1955–1956
Chauncey Sheridan	1956–1957
L.A. Waterman	1957–1958
Verne W. Uker	1958–1959
Reeder C. Hutchinson	1959–1960
Harris Solomon	1960–1961
C.L. Schmitt	1961–1962
Irving Lewis	1962–1963
Arnold Drennen	1963–1964
Thorton Poole	1964–1965
Dr. Richard O. Mossey	1965–1966
Howard Bamman	1966–1967
Sydney S. Bergson	1967–1968
J. Ronald Haines	1968–1969
Royal Brin Jr.	1969–1970
William G. Strickland	1970–1971
Austin C. Gorham	1971–1972
Robert B. Hurt	1972–1973
Earle J. Christenberry Jr.	1973–1974
Charles Lantz	1974–1975
William Preston Slusher	1975–1976
Walter F. Williams	1976–1977
Jeffery Atkins	1977–1978
Bill Pitts	1978–1979
Ray Mangel	1979–1980
Bruce Posgate	1980–1981
Roger Crabtree	1981–1982
John Makar	1982–1983
William A. Wells	1983–1984
Donald E. Wiberg	1984–1985
William E. Spooner	1985–1986
Karrell Fox	1986–1987
June Horowitz	1987–1988
Edward A. Morris	1988–1989
Anthony Shelley	1989–1990
Michael Ellis	1990–1991
Michael J. Gorman	1991–1992
James L. Nagel	1992–1993
R.J. Obie O'Brien	1993–1994
Jep Hostetler	1994–1995
Kenneth Klosterman	1995–1996
Bev Bergeron	1996–1997
Abb Dickson	1997–1998
John R. Browne	1998–1999
Jerry Schnepp	1999–2000
Jack Greenberg	2000–2001
Robert A. Escher	2001–2002
Michael Stratman	2002–2003
David Sandy	2003–2004
Tony Wilson	2004–2005
Roger Miller	2005–2006
Fred Casto	2006–2007
Phil Willmarth	2007–2008
Joan Caesar    2008–2009
Jack White	2009–2010
Rolando Santos	2010–2011
Vanni Pulé	2011–2012
John Pye	2012–2013
Bill Evans	2013–2014
Shawn Farquhar	2014–2015
Joe M. Turner  2015–2016
Oscar Muñoz    2016–2017
Bob Patterson     2017–2018
Michael Finney  2018–2019
Alex Zander  2019–2020
Stephen Bargatze  2020–2021
Ken Scott  2021–2022
Billy Hsueh  2022 - 2023

Conventions
The International Brotherhood of Magicians holds annual conventions, usually around the 4th of July weekend.
In 2008, 2014, and 2017, the I.B.M. and the Society of American Magicians hosted a combined convention. More than 1,900+ amateur and professional magicians from around the world attended the gatherings in Louisville, Kentucky, in July 2008, in St. Louis, Missouri, in July 2014, and again in Louisville, Kentucky, in July 2017.

Contest Awards 
The International Brotherhood of Magicians held the world's first magic convention in 1926. Contests are held, and awards are given in several categories. Below is a listing of the First Place winners as noted in the I.B.M. Official publication, The Linking Ring. The Gold Cups and Gold Medal Awards are highly coveted and not awarded every year. Additional data for years not listed are available online and were published in the 2019 I.B.M. 91st Annual Convention souvenir program.

+ The 2021 I.B.M. Convention was held virtually due to Covid concerns. Contests entries were selected from pre-recorded performance submissions.

See also 
 Magic conventions

References

External links
  International Brotherhood of Magicians (I.B.M.) - official site

Magic organizations
Organizations established in 1922
Organizations based in St. Louis